Astarte is the Hellenized form of the Ancient Near Eastern goddess ʿAṯtart. ʿAṯtart was the Northwest Semitic equivalent of the East Semitic goddess Ishtar.

Astarte was worshipped from the Bronze Age through classical antiquity, and her name is particularly associated with her worship in the ancient Levant among the Canaanites and Phoenicians, though she was originally associated with Amorite cities like Ugarit and Emar, as well as Mari and Ebla. She was also celebrated in Egypt, especially during the reign of the Ramessides, following the importation of foreign cults there. Phoenicians introduced her cult in their colonies on the Iberian Peninsula.

Name

Overview
In various cultures Astarte was connected with some combination of the following spheres: war, sexuality, royal power, beauty, healing and - especially in Ugarit and Emar - hunting; however, known sources do not indicate she was a fertility goddess, contrary to opinions in early scholarship. Her symbol was the lion and she was also often associated with the horse and by extension chariots. The dove might be a symbol of her as well, as evidenced by some Bronze Age cylinder seals. The only images identified with absolute certainty as Astarte as these depicting her as a combatant on horseback or in a chariot. While many authors in the past asserted that she has been known as the deified morning and/or evening star, it has been called into question if she had an astral character at all, at least in Ugarit and Emar. God lists known from Ugarit and other prominent Bronze Age Syrian cities regarded her as the counterpart of Assyro-Babylonian goddess Ištar, and of the Hurrian Ishtar-like goddesses Ishara (presumably in her aspect of "lady of love") and Shaushka; in some cities, the western forms of the name and the eastern form "Ishtar" were fully interchangeable.

In later times Astarte was worshipped in Syria and Canaan. Her worship spread to Cyprus, where she may have been merged with an ancient Cypriot goddess. This merged Cypriot goddess may have been adopted into the Greek pantheon in Mycenaean and Dark Age times to form Aphrodite. It has been argued, however, that Astarte's character was less erotic and more warlike than Ishtar originally was, perhaps because she was influenced by the Canaanite goddess Anat, and that therefore Ishtar, not Astarte, was the direct forerunner of the Cypriot goddess. Greeks in classical, Hellenistic, and Roman times occasionally equated Aphrodite with Astarte and many other Near Eastern goddesses, in keeping with their frequent practice of syncretizing other deities with their own.

Major centers of Astarte's worship in the Iron Age were the Phoenician city-states of Sidon, Tyre, and Byblos. Coins from Sidon portray a chariot in which a globe appears, presumably a stone representing Astarte. "She was often depicted on Sidonian coins as standing on the prow of a galley, leaning forward with right hand outstretched, being thus the original of all figureheads for sailing ships." In Sidon, she shared a temple with Eshmun. Coins from Beirut show Poseidon, Astarte, and Eshmun worshipped together.

Other significant locations where she was introduced by Phoenician sailors and colonists were Cythera, Malta, and Eryx in Sicily from which she became known to the Romans as Venus Erycina. Three inscriptions from the Pyrgi Tablets dating to about 500 BC found near Caere in Etruria mentions the construction of a shrine to Astarte in the temple of the local goddess Uni-Astre. At Carthage Astarte was worshipped alongside the goddess Tanit, and frequently appeared as a theophoric element in personal names.

Iconography
Iconographic portrayal of Astarte, very similar to that of Tanit, often depicts her naked and in presence of lions, identified respectively with symbols of sexuality and war. She is also depicted as winged, carrying the solar disk and the crescent moon as a headdress, and with her lions either lying prostrate to her feet or directly under those. Aside from the lion, she's associated to the dove and the bee. She has also been associated with botanic wildlife like the palm tree and the lotus flower.

A particular artistic motif assimilates Astarte to Europa, portraying her as riding a bull that would represent a partner deity. Similarly, after the popularization of her worship in Egypt, it was frequent to associate her with the war chariot of Ra or Horus, as well as a kind of weapon, the crescent axe. Within Iberian culture, it has been proposed that native sculptures like those of Baza, Elche or Cerro de los Santos might represent an Iberized image of Astarte or Tanit.

Attestations

At Ebla

In early Mari

One text from Mari records that offerings were made to both ʿAṯtarat and the river-god Nārum together.

Among Amorites

In Amorite Mari

A contemporary incantation against snakebites from ʾUgaritu recorded the existence of a manifestation of ʿAṯtartu who resided in Mari.

At Ugarit

ʿAṯtartu at ʾUgaritu was associated with the goddess ʿAnatu, with ʿAnatu usually preceding ʿAṯtartu, and the two goddesses were often connected to each other through poetic parallelism. Both goddesses shared common traits such as perfect beauty, which characterised young goddesses, with the human Ḥuraya being compared to them in the text  using the terms  (. ),  in which ʿAnatu and ʿAṯtartu were connected through poetic parallels.

Another trait which both ʿAnatu and ʿAṯtartu shared was their love of war, and their pairing appears to have been due to their common roles as beautiful huntress and warrioress goddesses. The Ugaritic ʿAṯtartu nevertheless did not yet possess the erotic traits of the later Canaanite ʿAštart.

As hunter goddess
The following lines recorded that the goddess saw something whose name is lost due to damage to the text, and line 5 mentions that the deeps surge with water, which might either refer to a celestial sign or to a possible damp terrain where ʿAṯtartu was hunting. The lines 6-13 described ʿAṯtartu taking cover in the low ground and holding her weapons while hunting, and she finally slew an animal whose name is lost in line 14. Following this, ʿAṯtartu fed the animal she had slain to the gods ʾIlu and Yariḫu.

Thus, present in the Northwest Semitic goddess was present a trait which was also characteristic of the South Arabian masculine hypostasis of ʿAṯtar, in whose honour sacred hunts were performed as fertility rite. This hunter aspect of ʿAṯtartu later faded away by the 1st millennium BC.

ʿAṯtartu also appears as a huntress in the text , where she and her sister ʿAnatu are consistently described as hunting together and bringing back game whose meat they distributed to the gods. In this text, ʿAṯtartu is mentioned before ʿAnatu, unlike most Ugaritic texts where this order is inverted, although the two goddesses are again connected through poetic parallels in the lines 10 to 11, reading .

As warrior goddess
Attestations of ʿAṯtartu as a warrior goddess at ʾUgaritu are minimal, with the principal one being her role in the text , where she and ʿAnatu together restrain Baʿlu by holding, respectively, his left and right hands. This text also linked ʿAṯtartu and ʿAnatu through poetic parallelism in the lines .

Moreover, the attribute animal of Rašpu was the lion, which was analogous to the lioness being the symbol of the warrior goddess ʿAṯtartu.

As healer goddess
In the text , ʿAṯtartu and ʿAnatu also went to hunt for ingredients to cure the drunkenness of ʾIlu, to whose household they belonged, and they are later mentioned in the narrative as applying the components of the cure to cause the healing, thus connecting the two goddesses with healing.

Among the Ugaritic incantations mentioning ʿAṯtartu are two where she is invoked to protect against snakebites: in the first incantation, from the text , which is part of a sequence addressed to the sun-goddess Šapšu to be delivered to a succession of deities, she is mentioned immediately after ʿAnatu, and the two goddesses' names are combined in the form , and the incantation itself is intended to be delivered to ʿAnatu's home at ʾInbubu, thus putting ʿAṯtartu on a secondary level compared to ʿAnatu. ʿAṯtartu was also mentioned on the side of the tablet on which the inscription was written. In this incantation, the first instance of ʿAṯtartu was that of ʿAṯtartu of ʾUgaritu, while the second one was ʿAṯtartu of Mari.

In a second incantation against snakebites, from the text , ʿAṯtartu was mentioned after ʿAnatu in a pairing of the two goddesses as part of a list also including pairings of Baʿlu and Dagānu, and Rašpu and Yariḫu.

As leonine goddess
ʿAṯtartu's emblem was the lion, and she was explicitly called a lioness and a panther in the hymn , which reads:

The hymn especially emphasises ʿAṯtartu and her name, with its mention of the goddess as "name" possibly being connected to her role as the Name-of-Baʿlu, and the second line calls her a "lioness" while the fourth and fifth lines liken her to a panther. This association of ʿAṯtartu with the lion corroborates with significant comparative evidence from ancient West Asia and North Africa:
 ʿAṯtart herself was identified with multiple lion-goddesses in Egypt;
 the Phoenician goddess Tinnit, whose name was linked to that of ʿAṯtart's later Phoenician iteration, ʿAštōrt, was represented with a lion's head;
 the masculine counterpart of ʿAṯtartu, ʿAṯtaru, was also called .

As gender non-conforming goddess
Although divine roles were often modelled on human ones, such as masculine gods in relation to patriarchy and kingship being represented like human men, and feminine goddesses in relation to marriage and domestic chores being represented like human women, the exceptional roles of ʿAṯtartu and ʿAnatu as hunter and warrior goddesses signalled them as being at odds with the social norms of the societies where human women were not supposed to hunt of which they were deities.

Thus, while Baʿlu and Rašpu were both hunter gods whose roles as such made them conform to masculine gender roles, the roles of ʿAṯtartu and ʿAnatu as hunter and warrior goddesses constituted an inversion with respect to the gender roles of human women. This made them role models and mentors, as ʿAnatu does in the story of ʾAqhatu, in which she addresses him with the intimate term "my brother" and tells him that she will instruct him in hunting, thus being able to bond with the addressee and be present and active in him development into an accomplished hunter.

The episode of ʿAṯtartu performing filial duties by "shutting down the jaws" of the enemies of ʾIlu was another case of gender inversion where the goddess successfully performed actions which among mortals were reserved for men only.

Manifestations

As member of the household of ʾIlu

As consort of Baʿlu
Although there is little to no evidence of ʿAṯtartu being explicitly considered the consort of Baʿlu at ʾUgaritu, the text  did refer to Baʿlu as sexually desiring ʿAṯtartu, with possible mention of a bed in line 32 of the text perhaps alluding to these two deities engaging in sexual intercourse.

Although the once widespread view that ʿAnatu was also a consort of Baʿlu has recently fallen out of favour due to lack of evidence from ʾUgaritu, indirect evidence, such as Egyptian adaptations of West Semitic myths in which both ʿAṯtartu and ʿAnatu were the consorts of Baʿlu might constitute indirect evidence that this might also have been the case at ʾUgaritu.

Sacrifice to ʿAṯtartu might have been included in the list of sacrifices for the family of Baʿlu in the Ugaritic text  possibly because ʿAṯtartu might have been regarded as the consort of Baʿlu at ʾUgaritu. Contemporary sources, including Egyptian adaptations of West Semitic myths which feature ʿAṯtartu and ʿAnatu as the brides of Baʿlu, and later sources, such as the role of the Phoenician ʿAštōrt as the consort of Baʿl, also suggest that ʿAṯtartu was a consort of Baʿlu, although this evidence is still very uncertain and this pairing appears to have been distinctly Levantine.

As the "Name of Baʿlu"
Another connection between ʿAṯtartu and Baʿlu was through her name . This name defined the identity of the goddess as being in relation to Baʿlu.

Cult
The Ugaritic deity-lists gave minimal importance to ʿAṯtartu in the realm of rituals, and she was the last mentioned in several of these, although she was nevertheless important politically for the ruling dynasty of ʾUgaritu and the administration of that city-state, being thus associated with the institution of the monarchy. In one letter to the king of ʾUgaritu concerning maritime commercial activities with Cyprus, the lines 6 to 9 read , placing Baʿlu and ʿAṯtartu in the initial position and naming ʿAṯtartu first, before the other Ugaritic goddesses, indicating the political importance of ʿAṯtartu at ʾUgaritu.

The temple of ʿAṯtartu was likely located within the city of ʾUgaritu, perhaps within the complex of the city's royal palace itself, with administrative records mentioning the existence of cultic personnel devoted to the goddess at this temple, the Ugaritic Akkadian text  referring to a servant of the goddess and the text  mentioning singers of ʿAṯtartu, while the text  contains the record of a payment of silver for the temple of the goddess immediately before that of a payment for the temple of the god Rašpu.

Ugaritic administrative texts also mentioned the use of wine in the royal rituals pertaining to ʿAṯtartu, with the ritual text  mentioning the offering of a jar of wine to the goddess's manifestation of ʿAṯtartu Ḫurri.

Although ʿAṯtartu had none of the erotic traits of her later Canaanite variant, ʿAṯtartu Šadî/Ištar Ṣēri was nevertheless present in hierogamy royal entry rituals whereby a statue or a woman representing the goddess was inserted in the alcove of ʾUgaritu's royal palace.

Due to these aspects of the goddess, Akkadian texts from ʾUgaritu and Emar identified ʿAṯtartu with her Mesopotamian counterpart Ištar, with the Akkadian milieu within which the Ugaritic texts were composed not distinguishing ʿAṯtartu from Ištar, and the Akkadian text  from ʾUgaritu referred to a second temple of hers as the "-temple of Ištar."

At Emar
Like at ʾUgaritu, she did not exhibit any astral traits and was not associated to her masculine counterpart, ʿAṯtar.

, variously interpreted as "ʿAṯtartu of the Sea," ʿAṯtartu as patron-goddess of the abû shrines and of the month Abî, or "ʿAṯtartu of the fathers";
 ;
 .()

As warrior goddess

As hunter goddess
ʿAṯtartu's connection to hunting at Emar in ritual settings is recorded in a text mentioning , that is the hunt of ʿAṯtartu, which was performed on the 16th of the month of Abi.

The line  also parallels the Sabaic hallowed phrase , used to refer to the ritual hunts performed for the South Arabian god ʿAṯtar, who was himself a masculine counterpart of ʿAṯtartu.

Another Emarite text records that the hunt of ʿAṯtartu was performed on the 16th of the month of Marzaḫāni, with the hunt of Baʿlu being on the 17th of this same month, and both hunts being mentioned together in the texts from Emar, suggesting that the hunt of the goddess involved game or provisions, and that ʿAṯtartu and Baʿlu appeared together at Emar, likely under the influence of their pairing in the Levant; Baʿlu himself appears as a hunter at ʾUgaritu, but never alongside ʿAṯtartu as he does at Emar.

As consort of Baʿlu
There is nonetheless little beyond this curcumstantial evidence at Emar for any pairing of ʿAṯtartu with Baʿlu, which appears to have been a Levantine occurrence.

Legacy
The worship of ʿAṯtartu in the Middle Euphrates region, including at Emar, lasted until the Late Bronze Age.

In Egypt

ʿAṯtart was eventually imported into New Kingdom Egypt, where she was renowned as a West Semitic war-goddess and often appeared alongside ʿAnat, with the West Semitic association of the two goddesses having also been borrowed by the Egyptians.

The cult of ʿAṯtart would remain well-established in Late Period Egypt, during the 1st millennium BC, at Min-nafir, where a significant community of Semitic origin had been living since the New Kingdom, and where a temple of the goddess was part of the city's temple of the god Pitaḥ. From at least as early as the 6th century BC, ʿAṯtart was identified with the Egyptian goddess , and a 7th century BC ivory box discovered at Ur and which had been dedicated to ʿAṯtart by the daughter of one an individual whose name,  (Peṭ-ʾIsi), meant "Given by Ꜣūsat," might have originated in Egypt.

As warrior goddess

During the 20th dynasty, one of the inscriptions of Ramesses III recording his military victories against the Libyans mentioned ʿAnat and ʿAṯtart in a praise to the king, ; and a poem contained the lines , which likened his chariot to the two goddesses.

ʿAṯtart was also worshipped at the Temple of Hbt in the Knmt Oasis, where she is depicted, under the name , three times on a 5th century BC relief, followed by Rešep.

During the Ptolemaic period, ʿAṯtart was depicted on a chariot in a relief from the Temple of Bḥdt, where she is called .

As 
The Egyptian goddess , who was depicted on 19th and 20th dynasty Egyptian stelae as a naked goddess with a Hathoric hairstyle, standing on a powerful lion and holding flowers or snakes in her outstretched hands, and often accompanied by Mnw and Rešep, was an Levantine-Egyptian hypostasis of ʿAṯtart.

As healer goddess
In a medical papyrus from the 14th century BC, which contains Northwest Semitic inscription written in Hieratic, the goddess, who is called , appears as a healer, and is mentioned alongside , that is the Northwest Semitic healer-god ʾEšmūn, to whom she would be often found associated later in Iron Age Phoenicia.

As hunter goddess
ʿAṯtart in the Wādī al-Ḥammāmāt text was referred to both as "ʿAttar my mother" and "the huntress," attesting of the continuation of the healer role of this goddess recorded since the Bronze Age at ʾUgaritu, as well as of her pairing with Baʿl. The incantation's invocation of ʿAṯtart and Baʿl against the "enemy," that is the scorpion which has stung an individual, parallels the combat of these deities against cosmic or divine enemies in the Ugaritic texts.

As consort of Sūtaẖ
In the 20th dynasty text, ʿAnat and ʿAṯtart are referred to as divine daughters who are also the future wives of the god Sūtaẖ, whom the Egyptians identified with Baʿl.

In the story of "ʿAṯtart and the Sea," which is an Egyptian translation of a Levantine mythological tradition, the Pisīḏat, which in this story stood for the West Semitic divine council headed by ʾIlu, initially offers tribute to the sea-god Ywmꜥ to be given to him by the goddess Rnn-wtt, and after this proves to be unsuccessful, they send him more appealing tribute to be delivered to him by ʿAṯtart, who weeps on being informed of this.

As the "Face of Baʿl"
ʿAṯtart was called "Face of Baʿl" in the Wādī al-Ḥammāmāt inscription, which defined the goddess as representing the presence of the god Baʿl, especially in his temple.

In Canaan

During the 11th to 10th centuries BC, the early Canaanites invoked the lioness aspect of their variant of ʿAštart through inscriptions bearing the name , meaning "Servant of the Lioness (that is), on arrowheads along with the name , meaning "Son of ʿAnat," implying that ʿAštart and ʿAnat were the patron-goddesses of the warriors who used these arrows.

In Phoenicia
The Phoenician variant of ʿAštart was the goddess , the pronunciation of whose name reflected the vowel shift from /ā/ to /ō/. By the time that the Canaanite Phoenician civilisation had emerged in the 1st millennium BC, ʿAštōrt overshadowed the other Semitic goddesses in the Phoenician pantheon and had become the main personification of a less war-like and more sensual vitality.

Like her East Semitic equivalent, Ištar, the Phoenician ʿAštōrt was a complex goddess with multiple aspects: being the feminine principle of the life-giving force, ʿAštōrt was a fertility goddess who promoted love and sensuality, in which capacity she presided over the reproduction of cattle and family growth; the goddess was also the consort of the masculine principle of this life-giving force, variously personified as Hadad or Baʿl, who himself incarnated plant growth and presided over rain, water, springs, floods, and the sprouting and growth of cereals. This pairing of ʿAštōrt and Baʿl was later mentioned in the 1st century AD by Philōn of Byblos, who wrote about the goddess Astarte and Zeus (that is, Baʿl), called Adōdos (itself a Hellenisation of Phoenician ) and Dēmarous, ruling over the land with the consent of Kronos (that is, ʾEl).

As well as the goddess of carnal love and of fertility, ʿAštōrt was also a warrior goddess, although she no longer exhibited much of the hunter aspect of the Bronze Age ʿAṯtart, which had faded away so that by the 1st millennium BC the hunting scenes on the shrine of the Phoenician ʿAštōrt at the temple of Bustān aš-Šayḫ depicted her consort in the city-state of Ṣidōn, the god ʾEšmūn, as a male hunter figure; ʿAštōrt was also a celestial goddess possessing astral traits and who was identified with the Morning Star, and occasionally to the Moon. The dove was a sacred animal of ʿAštōrt, as, like with her East Semitic equivalent Ištar, was the lion.

The cult of ʿAštōrt reached its highest level of prestige among the Phoenicians, in both mainland Phoenicia and thanks to the extensive maritime trade endeavours of the Phoenicians, in the Phoenician, and later Punic, colonies throughout the Mediterranean world, with her worship being recorded in Cyprus, as well as in Punic Africa and Sicily, with the oldest recorded mention of the Phoenician ʿAštōrt is from an 8th century inscription from a bronze statuette, often called the Seville statuette or the El Carambolo statuette, which had been imported into Iberia from mainland Phoenicia.

During the Hellenistic period, the Phoenicians identified their own goddess ʿAštōrt with the Egyptian goddess  due to the influence of the Egyptian Osiris myth on their own conceptualisations of the afterlife and salvation.

Iconography 
ʿAštōrt was often depicted as a naked goddess because of her role as a fertility and sexuality goddess, and many terracotta figures of naked women found in Palestine were depictions of ʿAštōrt, although not every image of a naked woman from this location was a representation of her. ʿAštōrt was also depicted in the form of "concubines of the dead" statuettes placed in burials, as well as in sympathetic magic figurines possessing fertile traits intended to ensure that women desiring to have children would become pregnant.

Images of an armed goddess might also have been representation of ʿAštōrt as a goddess of war and hunting, due to which she was often depicted on horseback or on a war chariot, sometimes holding an epsilon axe.

ʿAštōrt was often depicted with a "Hathoric" hairstyle, which connected her with the Phoenician ivory scultpures of the woman at the window and to amulets representing a goddess who was analogous to Qedešet. ʿAštōrt was also sometimes depicted surrounded by twin gods in some Phoenician coins.

ʿAštōrt Ḥor 

The cult of ʿAštōrt Ḥor held a certain importance, especially as part of royal rituals, and her domains were located at Šuksu, and at Ṣaʾu, a town belonging to the city-state of Siyān.

As the "Name of Baʿl" 
This name defined the identity of the goddess as being in relation to Baʿl.

At Sidon
The worship of ʿAštōrt at the Phoenician city-state of Ṣidōn dates from the Late Bronze Age, when her name was recorded in Hittite texts, Ugaritic epics, and evocatory formulae.

The kings of Ṣidōn from the 5th century BC, such as ʾEšmūnʿazor I and his son Tabnit I, included "priest of ʿAštōrt" as part of their royal titulatory, and while Tabnit I's son, ʾEšmūnʿazor II, who died when he was 14 years old, did not hold the title of "priest of ʿAštōrt," his mother ʾImmī-ʿAštōrt was "priestess of ʿAštōrt." Before his death, ʾEšmūnʿazor II and his mother ʾImmī-ʿAštōrt had built a sanctuary of ʿAštōrt at Ṣidōn ʾArṣ Yam (Ṣidōn-Land-by-the-Sea), another sanctuary in the city's district of šmm ʾdrm (the Lofty Heavens), and a third sanctuary for ʿAštōrt šim Baʿl, with ʾEšmūnʿazor II's cousin and successor Bod-ʿAštōrt having expanded the sanctuary of Ṣidōn ʾArṣ Yam.

As attested by three statuettes of children inscribed with dedications reading , which mention ʿAštōrt along with the god (ʾEšmūn), the 6th to 4th century temple of this god at Bustān aš-Šayḫ where these statuettes were found was in fact a common sanctuary of ʾEšmūn and ʿAštōrt. A large shrine to ʿAštōrt was located on the eastern side of the sanctuary, below the platform upon which the temple proper rested, and it contained a paved waterpool and a stone throne flanked with sphinxes decicated to the Sidonian ʿAštōrt, which itself rested against the background wall, which was decorated with hunting scenes.

During the period of the middle Roman Empire, a Sidonian coin of the Roman empress Julia Cornelia Paula was issued bearing the image of ʿAštōrt resting her right arm on a cross-headed standard and holding a ship's stern in her left hand while crowned by the Roman goddess of victory, Victoria.

At Byblos
The temple of ʿAštōrt at Afqa, in the territory of the city-state of Byblos, was one of the most renowned sanctuaries in ancient Phoenicia, located at the source of the Adonis river, where, according to Melitōn of Sardis, was the tomb of Adonis, whose blood turned the river's water red when he died there; according to Pseudo-Melito, this was the location of the tomb of Tammuz; and this temple was believed in ancient times to have been built by the legendary Cypriot king Kinuras, and it contained a waterpool, as well as pipelines which were used for lustrations linked to the cultic practises, and sacred prostitution, which was a typical part of the cult of ʿAštōrt, was also performed there.

ʿAštōrt of Afqa, who possessed erotic traits, was a goddess of the planet Venus as the Evening Star which brought together the sexes. This goddess later identified in Graeco-Roman times with the Greek goddess .

By the Hellenistic period, the goddess  had become explicitly assimilated to ʿAštōrt, and therefore to the Greek , with whom ʿAštōrt was herself equated, at Byblos, as well as at Afqa.

According to Zōsimos, a phenomenon would take place at site of the temple of Afqa whereby a bright and fiery star-like object would be shot up from the top of a Lebanese mountain and would fall into the Adonis river. Pilgrims would gather at the temple on days of this occurrence, and would throw precious objects, such as gold- and silverworks or linen or sea silk into the waterpool of the temple as offerings: the offerings which sunk into the water were believed to have been accepted by ʿAštōrt while the ones which floated were considered to have been rejected by the goddess.

The Roman emperor Constantine I ordered the destruction of the temple of Afqa, although Zosimus and Salamanēs Hermeias Sōzomenos in the 5th century AD recorded that pilgrims still gathered at the site of the temple to make offerings on the days when the luminous phenomenon would occur. The temple building itself was permanently destroyed in an earthquake during the 6th century AD, although it remained a popular sacred site connected to fertility until recent times.

and 

Although the goddess , whose first attestation was from the city of Sarepta, has been argued to have been a hypostasis of ʿAštōrt in older scholarship, the two goddesses to have been nevertheless possibly distinguished from each other in inscriptions. However, the evidence for so is still ambiguous and the name  might itself have been a title which was attributed to multiple deities, including to ʿAštōrt. One inscription from Sarepta recording the dedication of a statue to  nevertheless suggests some form of identification between Tinnit and ʿAštōrt.

At Akko
ʿAštōrt held high importance in the religious structure of the city-state of Akko, where she was identified with the Greek goddess Aphroditē in Graeco-Roman times, when she was the patron-goddess of the city's public baths.

The goddess was however most often depicted on the coins of Akko under the traits of the Greek goddess  in the latter's role as the patron goddess of a municipality, in which capacity she was represented as seated on a rock, wearing a crown made of crenellated towers, and placing one foot on the shoulder of a young swimmer who personnified the river Orontes, although the swimmer in the coins of Akko stood for the river-god Belus, that is the present-day Nahr al-Naʿāmayn, and he held a reed and leans over an amphora, with a crocodile beneath him.

Under the reign of the Roman Emperor Publius Licinius Valerianus, ʿAštōrt was depicted coins similarly to a Syrian goddess, with a calathus hat, and seated between two lions like ʿAttarʿatta, with her right hand in a blessing position and her left one holding a flower.

At Tyre

At Tyre, ʿAštōrt was closely associated to the god Melqart and was his consort, a custom which was carried on by the colonists who set out from Tyre to establish themsselves throughout the Mediterranean sea.

At the site of Ḫirbat aṭ-Ṭayibā, to the south of Tyre, a stone throne was dedicated to ʿAštōrt in a sacred site located in the middle of the fields of the one who offered the dedication.

In the Tyrian town of Ḥamon, ʿAštōrt formed a triad with the god Milk-ʿAštōrt and the Angel of Milk-ʿAštōrt, and the city's sanctuary of Milk-ʿAštōrt contained a dedication to ʿAštōrt.

In the 7th century BC, the warrior goddess role of ʿAštōrt was invoked in the treaty between the Assyrian king Aššur-aḫa-iddina and the Tyrian king Baʿl I in a line reading .

The association between ʿAštōrt and Melqart at Tyre continued until the Roman period, and an inscription from the Severan dynasty mentions the goddess ʿAštōrt, under the name of the Greek goddess , along with Melqart, under the name of Hēraklēs.

ʿAštōrōniy

According to the 6th century AD Neoplatonist scholarch Damaskios, ʿAštōrōniy was the "mother of the gods," and had fallen in love with a young hunter, ʾEšmūn of Berytus, who castrated himself to escape her, but whom the goddess resurrected.

The name of ʿAštōrōniy was given to a Tyrian port, and she was mentioned in a Tyrian inscription from the 1st century AD after "Hēraklēs," that is Melqart. The name ʿAštōrōniy is also recorded from Rhodes in the eastern Mediterranean, and from Carthage in the western Mediterranean.

In Egypt
Due to the influence of the Egyptian Osiris myth, the Phoenicians who lived in Egypt during the Hellenistic period continued the identification of ʿAštōrt with Ꜣūsat, in which capacity they worshipped this latter goddess.

In Cyprus
The worship of ʿAštōrt is widely attested in ancient Cyprus, where she had been assimilated to the Greek goddess Aphroditē from early times, due to which many early shrines of Aphroditē in Cyprus showed partial Phoenician influence.

At Kition

The inhabitants of the Kition identified ʿAštōrt with the Greek goddess Aphroditē Ourania.

At Paphos

At Amathous
The goddess ʿAštōrt was the main deity of the city of Amathous, where stood one of the most famous temples of hers at the top of the acropolis of the city. The temple of ʿAštōrt of Amathous was erected in the 8th century BC, when the city was under Tyrian influence, with the presence of two Phoenician graffiti and Phoenician-type anthropoid sarcophagi at Amathous and Kition attesting of the existence of a Phoenician community living in these cities. During the 6th and 5th centuries BC, local hand-made votive figurines were associated to Phoenician-type small moulded plates depicting ʿAštōrt as a naked standing goddess holding her breasts, as well as to small Greek-type .

Although Graeco-Roman authors had claimed that it was forbidden to spill blood in the temple of Amathous, remains of Hellenistic sacrifices provided evidence that goats and sheep were the main animals offered in sacrifice at the shrine ʿAštōrt.

In the Aegean Sea and Greece
The name of the goddess ʿAštōrt was used as a theophoric element in several personal names, attested at Athens, Aphrodisias, Delos, and Rhodes, in their Hellenised forms and including the element  (from ).

In Rhodes

At Delos
A Sidonian woman is recorded as having honoured ʿAštōrt, assimilated to the Egyptian Ꜣūsat, in the official Serapeum of Delos.

At Kos
At Kos, a Phoenician thiasote took ʿAštōrt and Zeus Soter (that is, Baʿl Mahalāk) as his patron deities, and a son of the Sidonian king Abdalonymus dedicated a piece of maritime art to the goddess ʿAštōrt-Aphroditē.

In Malta
In the late 8th century BC, Phoenicians repurposed an old Copper Age megalithic structure at Tas-Silġ on the island of Malta into a temple of ʿAštōrt where offerings were given to her by readjusting its walls, placing their alter on an older altar stone, building several shrines, and placing there large numbers of votive gifts, especially Hellenistic-style statues.

The sanctuary of ʿAštōrt at Tas-Silg was of large dimensions, being 100 metres wide, and was renowned in antiquity for its great wealth.

A temple of ʿAštōrt also existed on the island of Gozo.

In Sicily
ʿAštōrt worshipped in Sicily at the Mount Eryx, where stood a temple a goddess, on a rocky outcrop which domonates from its north-east the city of Eryx, which itself was a town which had once belonged to the Elymians and was an ally of the Phoenicians settled at Ṣiṣ and Moṭwē before becoming a Punic fort during the 4th to 3rd century BC.

Claudius Aelianus recounted a legend, according to which the Veneris fānum possessed an open-air altar from which all the sacrifices offered to the goddess during the day would disappear during the night and would be replaced with dew and fresh herbs, which was similar to some characteristics of the cult of the Cypriot ʿAštōrt.

Older coins depicted the goddess of Eryx with a dove, which was an attribute of the Levantine ʿAštōrt, as well as with the Greek Erōs, the son of Aphroditē, and a dog, which was commonly found within Phoenician religion and thus showed the presence of West Asian influences on her. Later coins represent her wearing a laurel wreath and a diadem.

Another typically Levantine aspect of the cult of the ʿAštōrt of Eryx was the practise of sacred prostitution, which was carried out by the "servants" of the goddess. Sacred prostitution at the Veneris fānum was well-known enough in antiquity that Titus Maccius Plautus recorded an old man's advice to a pimp in which he mentioned that courtesans at the shrine would earn large amounts of money.

The worship of this goddess later spread to the Graeco-Roman world, where her worship is attested at Rome, Herculaneum, Dikaiarkhia, Potentia, and Greece.

In Carthage
In Carthage and in Phoenico-Punic Africa in general, the goddess Tinnit appears to have displaced ʿAštōrt and taken over her roles, due to which she became called , who was often paired with the supreme Carthaginian god Baʿl Ḥamōn.

Although the goddess ʿAštōrt held lesser importance in North Africa, she was worshipped at Carthage, where her cult was imported directly from Phoenicia, especially from Tyre and Ṣidōn, as well as from Eryx.

A 7th century BC golden medallion from Carthage mentioned the goddess ʿAštōrt alongside an individual named Pygmalion to whom the medallion belonged.

It was likely the warrior form of the goddess who was worshipped in this temple, since her weapons and chariot were kept there.

The Punic general Ḥannī-Baʿl invoked ʿAštōrt, referring to her in Greek as Hēra, as one of the many deities he took as witness in the treaty he concluded with the king Philip V of Macedon.

During the 3rd to 2nd centuries BC, a temple to the Egyptian goddess Ꜣūsat, identified to ʿAštōrt, existed at Carthage.

The Romans also rebuilt the temple of ʿAštōrt and dedicated it to Iūnō Caelestis, who was thus a Roman continuation of the initial Punic cult of ʿAštōrt, and a distinct goddess from the native Roman Iūnō Rēgīna. During the Roman period, ʿAštōrt was still worshipped under her Phoenician name at Thuburbo Maius, where she was identified with Iūnō Caelestis.

The identification of ʿAštōrt with the Egyptian Ꜣūsat continued in the formerly Punic territories of North Africa after the Roman conquest, and several  existed in the region under Roman rule.

The worship of ʿAštōrt-Caelestis held an exceptional importance at Mididi, where she was called by her Phoenician-Punic name, and was called the "wife of Baʿl," as recorded in a neo-Punic inscription reading  Attesting of her primacy at Mididi was a stela discovered there, with the goddess being depicted on its pediment, while on its lower level was the African Saturn (that is, Baʿl Ḥamōn), to whose right was the goddess Kubeleya seated on her lion, who was herself identified at Mididi with ʿAštōrt, and not with Tanit.

The Roman temple of Iūnō Caelestis, according to the 5th century AD Bishop of Carthage, Quodvultdeus, was of large proportions, and was surrounded by shrines to various deities associated to the goddess, and the 5th century AD Bishop of Byzacena Victor Vitensis described it as being located near the Baths of Antoninus; the temple had already been desacrated under the reign of the Roman emperor Flavius Theodosius, and it was finally destroyed in 421 AD following unrest by the pagan population of the city.

In Italy
The Etruscans identified ʿAštōrt with their own goddess , as attested by the gold tablets discovered in 1964 at the site of renowned sanctuary built in the 6th century BC to the goddess Uni in the town of Pyrgi, the port of the Etruscan city-state of Cisra. Uni was associated to the god Tinia, who was the Etruscan equivalent of the Greek Zeus and was assimilated to Melqart, with the divine couple of Uni and Tinia being thus assimilated to the Phoenician-Punic divine couple of ʿAštōrt and Melqart.

The shrine of Pyrgi was a wealthy one, as evidenced by the 1500 talents which Dionysios I of Syracuse looted from it in 384 BC.

In Hispania
As attested by the Seville/El Carambolo Statuette, imported from the Levant to Hispania, the Phoenician activities in the Mediterranean had spread the cult of ʿAštōrt till Hispania.

The worship of ʿAštōrt also continued in Hispania after it was conquered by the Romans, with the goddess being there also called Iūnō, and the existence of a temple and an altar to "Iūnō," that is to ʿAštōrt, is mentioned by Artemidōros and Pomponius Mela. One Latin inscription from the Roman imperial period refers to a priest named Herculis whose father was named Iūnōnis, reflecting the Punic association of "Hercules" (Melqart) and "Iūnō" (ʿAštōrt).

The "Islands of Hēra," or "Islands of Iūnō," located in the Strait of Gibraltar, as well as the island of Iūnōnia in the Atlantic Ocean and the "Cape of Hēra" or "Cape of Iūnō" (presently Cape Trafalgar), also owed their names to ʿAštōrt.

In Britannia
Under the Roman Empire, the cult of ʿAštōrt had spread till the foot of Hadrian's Wall in Britannia, where she was invoked using her Phoenician name and associated to the "Tyrian Hēraklēs," that is to Melqart, thus being a continuation of the close connection between Melqart and ʿAštōrt, and attesting of the Phoenician origin of this cult.

Rituals
A typically Levantine aspect of the cult of ʿAštōrt was the practise of sacred prostitution, which was performed by specific categories of her temples' clergy who were exercised this function on a permanent basis. The different categories of sacred prostitutes were the:
 , who were sometimes simply called ;
 , who were male sacred prostitutes who engaged in homosexual intercourse;
  (or ), who were later called .

The practise of sacred prostitution is attested at the temple of ʿAštōrt in Byblos, and sacred prostitutes and "whelps" are recorded at the temples of ʿAštōrt at Afqa and Baalbek until the 4th century AD. The practise is also recorded in Cyprus, especially at Paphos, Amathous, and Kition, and in Sicily, at Eryx, from where two sacred prostitutes of Carthaginian origin are known by name:  and her daughter
.

Sacred prostitution in the honour of ʿAštōrt was also practised at Carthage, as well as at Sicca Veneria, which was renowned for its sacred prostitution rituals, and sacred prostitution might have also been performed at some brothels.

The Phoenician imagery of "the woman at the window," as well as the "Peeper" of Cyprus, the Venus prōspiciēns of Salamis, as well as the El Carambolo statuette depicting a naked ʿAštōrt and some specific feminine images were semantically connected to sacred prostitution performed in the honour of ʿAštōrt.

Legacy

In the writings of the 1st century AD Roman poet Publius Vergilius Maro, the goddess Venus mentioned the Cypriot shrine of ʿAštōrt at Amathous among her most famous temples.

The name ʿAštōrt's variant of ʿAštōrōniy was Hellenised as  under the influence of the Greek term  (.

In Palestine
The goddess  appears to have disappeared from most of inland Palestine during the Iron Age due to the ruling classes of the states in the region no longer identifying with the practise of hunting, so that her cult became restricted to the coastal areas such as in Philistia, where it enjoyed high prestige until the Graeco-Roman period.

One ceramic box from the 9th century discovered at the site of Tel Rehov was topped with a leonine figure, suggesting it was the emblematic animal of ʿAṯtart/ʿAštart, with an open mouth and dangling tongue lying in a prone position with its front limbs outstretched and of its paws placed, claws extended, each over a human head.

In Israel and Judah
Following the trend of the disappearance of the worship of ʿAštart in inland Palestine, the state-level cult of this goddess was absent from Israelite and Judahite records from an early date, and she seems to have become one of many former gods demoted to the status of entities and powers of blessing under the control of the Israelite national god Yahū.

The worship of ʿAštart might nevertheless have survived as a minor and popular, but not royal, cult among the Israelite population, with the practise of hunting for undomesticated animals to be sacrificed being restricted to the family and local shrines, but not at the state level.

The Bible claims that the Israelite king Šalōmō introduced the worship of the Phoenician ʿAštōrt, called  in its Hebrew text, in his kingdom, although it is uncertain whether this claim rests on any historical basis or if it was made retroactively as a reaction against Phoenician religious imports. The cult of the Phoenician ʿAštōrt appears to have nevertheless enjoyed some level of royal support during the later periods of the Israelite kingdom.

In Transjordan

Like in Israel and Ammon, there is no evidence of any cult of ʿAštart in Moab or Edom.

In Philistia

The inhabitants of the Philistine city-state of ʾAšqalōn worshipped ʿAštart and identified her with the Greek goddess Aphroditē Ourania.

Later interpretations of biblical Astaroth 
In some kabbalistic texts and in medieval and renaissance occultism (ex. The Book of Abramelin), the name  was assigned to a male demon bearing little resemblance to the figure known from antiquity. For the use of the Hebrew plural form  in this sense, see Astaroth.

Myths

At Ugarit
In the Baʿal Epic of Ugarit, Ashtart is one of the allies of the eponymous hero. With the help of Anat she stops him from attacking the messengers who deliver the demands of Yam and later assists him in the battle against the sea god, possibly "exhorting him to complete the task" during it. It's a matter of academic debate if they were also viewed as consorts. Their close relation is highlighted by the epithet "face of Baal" or "of the name of Baal."

A different narrative, so-called "Myth of Astarte the huntress" casts Ashtart herself as the protagonist, and seemingly deals both with her role as a goddess of the hunt stalking game in the steppe, and with her possible relationship with Baal.

Ashtart and Anat
Fragmentary narratives describe Ashtart and Anat hunting together. They were frequently treated as a pair in cult. For example, an incantation against snakebite invokes them together in a list of gods who asked for help. Texts from Emar, which are mostly of ritual nature unlike narrative ones known from Ugarit, indicate that Ashtart was a prominent deity in that city as well, and unlike in Ugarit, she additionally played a much bigger role in cult followings than Anat.

Misconceptions in scholarship
While the association between Ashtart and Anat is well attested, primary sources from Ugarit and elsewhere provide no evidence in support of the misconception that Athirat (Asherah) and Ashtart were ever conflated, let alone that Athirat was ever viewed as Baal's consort like Ashtart possibly was. Scholar of Ugaritic mythology and the Bible Steve A. Wiggins in his monograph A Reassessment of Asherah: With Further Considerations of the Goddess notes that such arguments rest on scarce biblical evidence (which indicates at best a confusion between obscure terms in the Book of Judges rather than between unrelated deities in Canaanite or Bronze Age Ugaritic religion) sums up the issue with such claims: "(...) Athtart begins with an ayin, and Athirat with an aleph. (...) Athtart appears in parallel with Anat in texts (...), but Athirat and Athtart do not occur in parallel." God lists from Ugarit indicate that Ashtart was viewed as analogous to Mesopotamian Ishtar and Hurrian Ishara, but not Athirat.

Other associations
Hittitologist Gary Beckman pointed out the similarity between Astarte's role as a goddess associated with horses and chariots to that played in Hittite religion by another "Ishtar type" goddess, Pinikir, introduced to Anatolia from Elam by Hurrians.

Allat and Astarte may have been conflated in Palmyra. On one of the tesserae used by the Bel Yedi'ebel for a religious banquet at the temple of Bel, the deity Allat was given the name Astarte ('štrt). The assimilation of Allat to Astarte is not surprising in a milieu as much exposed to Aramaean and Phoenician influences as the one in which the Palmyrene theologians lived.

Plutarch, in his On Isis and Osiris, indicates that the King and Queen of Byblos, who, unknowingly, have the body of Osiris in a pillar in their hall, are Melcarthus (i.e. Melqart) and Astarte (though he notes some instead call the Queen Saosis or Nemanūs, which Plutarch interprets as corresponding to the Greek name Athenais).

Lucian of Samosata asserted that, in the territory of Ṣidōn, the temple of Astarte was sacred to Europa. In Greek mythology Europa was a Phoenician princess whom Zeus, having transformed himself into a white bull, abducted, and carried to Crete.

Byron used the name Astarte in his poem Manfred.

In popular culture
 In Zadig; or, The Book of Fate (1747), a novella and work of philosophical fiction by the Enlightenment writer Voltaire, Astarté is a woman, a queen of Babylon reduced to slavery, who finds her first and only love: Zadig.
 The name Astarte was given to a massive post-starburst galaxy during the cosmic noon (the peak of the star formation rate density).
 Astarte appears as a playable Avenger-class Servant in Fate/Grand Order (2015), with her name stylized as "Ashtart". However, she first introduces herself as "Space Ishtar", and only reveals her true name after her third Ascension.

See also

 Aicha Kandicha
 Anat
 Attar (god)
 Ishtar
 Ishara
 Nanaya
 Nana (Kushan goddess)
 Star of Ishtar
 Tanit
 Venus

Notes

References

Bibliography

 
 
 
 
 
 
 
 
 
 
 
 
 
 
 
 
 
 
 
 
 
 
 Schmitt, Rüdiger. "Astarte, Mistress of Horses, Lady of the Chariot: The Warrior Aspect of Astarte." Die Welt Des Orients 43, no. 2 (2013): 213–25. Accessed June 28, 2020. www.jstor.org/stable/23608856.

External links

Britannica Online Encyclopedia - Astarte (ancient deity)
Jewish Encyclopedia - Astarte worship among the Hebrews

 
Deities in the Hebrew Bible
Egyptian goddesses
Hellenistic Asian deities
Hunting goddesses
Inanna
Levantine mythology
Lion deities
Love and lust deities
Love and lust goddesses
Lusitanian goddesses
Phoenician mythology
Queens of Heaven (antiquity)
Ugaritic deities
Venusian deities
War goddesses
West Semitic goddesses

ms:Dewi Astarte